Burr Oak Creek may refer to:

Burr Oak Creek (Little Blue River), a stream in Missouri
Burr Oak Creek (Nodaway River), a stream in Missouri